Nationality words link to articles with information on the nation's poetry or literature (for instance, Irish or France).

Events
 March 16 — Authorities in Saudi Arabia arrest and jail poet Abdul Mohsen Musalam and dismiss a newspaper editor following the publication of Musalam's poem "The Corrupt on Earth" which criticizes the state's Islamic judiciary, accusing some judges of being corrupt and issuing unfair rulings for their own personal benefit.
 August 22 — Poet Ron Silliman starts his popular and controversial weblog Silliman's Blog which will become one of the most popular blogs devoted largely to contemporary poetry and poetics. (By August 2006, the blog will reach a total of 800,000 hits and get its next 100,000 by early November.).
 September — Amiri Baraka (b. 1934), an African-American poet and political activist from Newark, New Jersey who was appointed the second Poet Laureate of New Jersey, ignites a controversy and accusations of anti-Semitism with a public reading of "Somebody Blew Up America" at the Geraldine R. Dodge Poetry Festival near Stanhope, New Jersey. Baraka's poem discusses the September 11 attacks in a way that is highly critical of racism in America, includes angry depictions of public figures such as Rudolph Giuliani, Trent Lott, Clarence Thomas, Condoleezza Rice, Colin Powell and Ward Connerly, accuses Israel of involvement in the World Trade Center attacks, and supports the theory that the United States government knew about the attacks in advance. Amid public outrage and pressure from state leaders, Baraka is asked to resign as the Poet Laureate by New Jersey Governor Jim McGreevey who had appointed him to the post two months earlier. Baraka refuses and, because there is no legal mechanism provided in the law to remove him as poet laureate, the state legislature and governor abolishes the position to remove him effective 2 July 2003.
 After Ghazi al-Gosaibi, the Saudi Arabian ambassador to Britain, publishes a poem praising a suicide bomber who had killed himself and two Israelis after blowing himself up in a supermarket, the ambassador is recalled home.
 The office of Canadian Parliamentary Poet Laureate is instituted (see "Awards and honors" section below).
 The office of Edinburgh Makar is instituted in Scotland, with Stewart Conn as first incumbent.
 Bowery Poetry Club, a New York City poetry performance space, is founded by Bob Holman.
 Fulcrum, An annual of poetry and aesthetics is founded in the United States.
 Influential Chinese literary magazine Tamen ("They/Them") is revived as a webzine at www.tamen.net.

Works published in English
Listed by nation where the work was first published and again by the poet's native land, if different; substantially revised works listed separately:

Australia
 Alison Croggon, Attempts at Being, Salt Publishing, .
 Robert Gray, Afterimages
 Emma Lew, Anything the Landlord Touches, won the 2003 C. J. Dennis Prize for Poetry and was short-listed for the Kenneth Slessor Prize for Poetry that same year
 Chris Mansell:
 Stalking the Rainbow (PressPress, 2002)
 Fickle Brat (IP Digital, Brisbane, 2002)
 Les Murray:
 Poems the Size of Photographs, Duffy & Snellgrove and Carcanet
 New Collected Poems, Duffy & Snellgrove; Carcanet, 2003

Canada
 Margaret Avison, Concrete and Wild Carrot
 Christian Bök, ’Pataphysics: The Poetics of an Imaginary Science 
 Dionne Brand, thirsty
 Michael Boughn, Dislocations in Crystal (Coach House Books) 
 Louis Cabri, The Mood Embosser (Coach House Books) 
 Margaret Christakos, Excessive Love Prostheses (Coach House Books) 
 Lise Downe, Disturbances of Progress (Coach House Books) 
 Rob Fitterman, Metropolis (Book 2) (Coach House Books) 
 Laura Lush:
 The First Day of Winter: Poetry, Vancouver: Ronsdale Press
 Going to the Zoo, Winnipeg: Turnstone Press
 Don McKay, Vis à Vis: Field Notes on Poetry & Wilderness
 George McWhirter, The Book of Contradictions
 Jay Millar, Mycological Studies (Coach House Books) 
 P. K. Page, Planet Earth: Poems Selected and New, edited and with an introduction by Eric Ormsby, Erin, ON: Porcupine's Quill
 Joe Rosenblatt, Parrot fever. collages by Michel Christensen. Toronto: Exile.
 Raymond Souster, Take Me Out to the Ballgame. Ottawa: Oberon Press.

India, in English
 Meena Alexander, Illiterate Heart ( Poetry in English ), Evanston, Illinois: TriQuarterly Books/Northwestern University Press, by an Indian writing living in and published in the United States
 Smita Agarwal, Wish-granting Words,(Poetry in English) New Delhi: Ravi Dayal Publisher, 2002. 
 Sujata Bhatt, A Colour for Solitude ( Poetry in English ), Carcanet Press
 Keki Daruwalla, The Map-maker ( Poetry in English ), Ravi Dayal
 Ranjit Hoskote, editor, Reasons for Belonging, Fourteen Contemporary Indian Poets ( Poetry in English ), New Delhi: Viking/Penguin Books India; anthology including work from: Jerry Pinto, Vijay Nambisan, C. P. Surendran, Smita Agarwal, Arundhati Subramaniam, Jeet Thayil, Tabish Khair, Ranjit Hoskote and Rukhmini Bhaya Nair, Vivek Narayanan, Gavin Barrett, Anjum Hasan and H. Masud Taj
 Sudeep Sen, Monsoon, re-issued in 2005 as Rain ( Poetry in English ); London: Aark Arts, 
 C. P. Surendran, Canaries on the Moon ( Poetry in English ), Kozhikode: Yeti, Chennai.
 Mallika Sengupta, Carriers Of Fire, (translated from the original Bengali, Kolkata: Bhashanagar

Ireland
 Vona Groarke, Flight, Oldcastle: The Gallery Press, Ireland
 Justin Quinn:
 Fuselage Oldcastle: The Gallery Press,
 Gathered Beneath the Storm: Wallace Stevens, Nature and Community, University College of Dublin Press, 2002 (criticism)

New Zealand
 James K. Baxter, The Tree House: James K. Baxter's Poems for Children (posthumous), the first illustrated edition of his work for children
 Janet Charman, Snowing Down South, Auckland: Auckland University Press
 Alan Brunton, Fq, a sequence of 144 poems (posthumous)
 Cilla McQueen, Soundings, Otago University Press
 Mike Minehan, O Jerusalem: James K. Baxter an Intimate Memoir
 Kendrick Smithyman, posthumous:
 Last Poems, Auckland: Holloway Press, designed by Tara hir poi a pek fhj nbb a: Auckland University Press
 Stephanie de Montalk, The Scientific Evidence of Dr Wang, Victoria University Press
 Kay McKenzie Cooke, Feeding the Dogs, Otago University Press)

Poets in Best New Zealand Poems
Best New Zealand Poems series, an annual online anthology, is started this year with Iain Sharp as the first annual editor. Twenty-five poems by 25 New Zealand poets are selected from the previous year. The first selection is called Best New Zealand Poetry 2001. Unlike The Best American Poetry series, the year named in each edition refers to the year the poems were originally published, not the following year, when the collection is put together and made public. Sharp chose poems published in 2001 from these poets: 

James K. Baxter
Jenny Bornholdt
Bernard Brown
James Brown
Alan Brunton

Kate Camp
Alistair Te Ariki Campbell
Allen Curnow
Leigh Davis
Chloe Gordon

Bernadette Hall
Dinah Hawken
Anna Jackson
Jan Kemp (writer)
James Naughton

Gregory O'Brien
Peter Olds
Bob Orr
Vincent O'Sullivan
Chris Price

Richard Reeve
Elizabeth Smither
Brian Turner
Ian Wedde
Nick Williamson

United Kingdom
 Neil Astley, editor, Staying Alive: real poems for unreal times (anthology)
 Anthony Burgess, Revolutionary Sonnets and Other Poems, edited by Kevin Jackson
 Ciarán Carson: The Inferno of Dante Alighieri (translator), Granta, awarded the Oxford-Weidenfeld Translation Prize
 Carol Ann Duffy, Feminine Gospels   Picador
 Elaine Feinstein, Collected Poems and Translations, Carcanet
 James Fenton: An Introduction to English Poetry
 Paul Henry, The Slipped Leash, Seren
 Ted Hughes, Selected Poems, 1957–1994 (Farrar, Straus & Giroux); a New York Times "notable book of the year"
 Glyn Maxwell, The Nerve (Houghton Mifflin); a New York Times "notable book of the year" (British poet living in America, poetry editor of The New Republic magazine)
 Sean O'Brien:
Cousin Coat: Selected Poems 1976–2001 (Picador)
With John Kinsella and Peter Porter, Rivers (Fremantle Arts Centre Press, Australia)
 Alice Oswald:
 Dart, Faber and Faber, 
 Co-editor, with Peter Oswald and Robert Woof), Earth Has Not Any Thing to Shew More Fair: A Bicentennial Celebration of Wordsworth's "Sonnet Composed upon Westminster Bridge" Shakespeare's Globe & The Wordsworth Trust, 
 John Heath-Stubbs, The Return of the Cranes
 Peter Redgrove, From the Virgil Caverns
 R.S. Thomas, Residues (posthumous)
 Hugo Williams, Collected Poems, Faber and Faber

United States
 Meena Alexander, Illiterate Heart, Evanston, Illinois: TriQuarterly Books/Northwestern University Press, by an Indian writing living in and published in the United States
 John Ashbery, Chinese Whispers
 Frank Bidart, Music Like Dirt (Sarabande Books), the only poetry chapbook ever nominated for a Pulitzer Prize
 Billy Collins, Nine Horses: Poems (Random House); a New York Times "notable book of the year"
 Robert Creeley, guest editor, The Best American Poetry 2002
Jim Dodge – Rain on the River
 Alan Dugan, Poems Seven: New and Complete Poetry (Seven Stories); a New York Times "notable book of the year"
 Michael S. Harper, Selected Poems, ARC Publications
 Paul Hoover, Winter Mirror, (Flood Editions)
 Kenneth Koch:
Sun Out: Selected Poems, 1952–1954, New York: Knopf
A Possible World, New York: Knopf
 Abba Kovner, Sloan-Kettering: Poems (Schocken); a New York Times "notable book of the year"
 Brad Leithauser, Darlington's Fall: A Novel in Verse (Knopf); a 5,700-line verse novel in 10-line stanzas, irregularly rhymed; a New York Times "notable book of the year"
 Glyn Maxwell, The Nerve (Houghton Mifflin); a New York Times "notable book of the year" (British poet living in America, poetry editor of The New Republic magazine)
 J.D. McClatchy, Hazmat: Poems (Knopf); a New York Times "notable book of the year"
 Czesław Miłosz, New and Collected Poems: 1931–2001 (Ecco/HarperCollins); a New York Times "notable book of the year"
 Paul Muldoon, Moy Sand and Gravel, winner of the 2003 Pulitzer Prize for Poetry and Griffin Poetry Prize and shortlisted for the 2002 T. S. Eliot Prize
 Lorine Niedecker, Lorine Niedecker: Collected Works, edited by Jenny Penberthy (University of California Press), posthumous
 Mary Oliver, What Do We Know
 Molly Peacock, Cornucopia: New & Selected Poems
 Carl Phillips, Rock Harbor
 Marie Ponsot, Springing: New and Selected Poems (Knopf); a New York Times "notable book of the year"
 Claudia Rankine and Juliana Spahr, editors, American Women Poets in the 21st Century: Where Lyric Meets Language, Wesleyan University Press, anthology including work by Lucie Brock-Broido, Harryette Mullen, Ann Lauterbach, Mei-mei Berssenbrugge, Brenda Hillman and Jorie Graham
 Margaret Reynolds, editor, The Sappho Companion (scholarship) Palgrave Macmillan,  
 W. G. Sebald, After Nature (Random House); a book-length poem; a New York Times "notable book of the year"
 Aharon Shabtai, Artzenu (Hebrew: "Our Land")
 Adam Zagajewski, Without End: New and Selected Poems (Farrar, Straus & Giroux); a New York Times "notable book of the year"

Poets in The Best American Poetry 2002
Poems from these 75 poets were in The Best American Poetry 2002, David Lehman, editor; Robert Creeley, guest editor:

Rae Armantrout
John Ashbery
Amiri Baraka
Charles Bernstein
Anselm Berrigan
Frank Bidart
Jenny Boully
T. Alan Broughton
Michael Burkard
Anne Carson
Elizabeth Biller Chapman
Tom Clark
Peter Cooley
Clark Coolidge
Ruth Danon

Diane di Prima
Theodore Enslin
Elaine Equi
Clayton Eshleman
Norman Finkelstein
Jeffrey Franklin
Benjamin Friedlander
Gene Frumkin
Forrest Gander
Peter Gizzi
Louise Glück
Albert Goldbarth
Donald Hall
Michael S. Harper
Everett Hoagland

Fanny Howe
Ronald Johnson
Maxine Kumin
Bill Kushner
Joseph Lease
Timothy Liu
Mộng-Lan
Jackson Mac Low
Nathaniel Mackey
Steve Malmude
Sarah Manguso
Harry Mathews
Duncan McNaughton
W. S. Merwin
Philip Metres

Jennifer Moxley
Eileen Myles
Maggie Nelson
Charles North
Alice Notley
D. Nurkse
Sharon Olds
George Oppen
Jena Osman
Carl Phillips
Pam Rehm
Adrienne Rich
Corinne Robins
Elizabeth Robinson
Ira Sadoff

Hugh Seidman
Reginald Shepherd
Ron Silliman
Dale Smith
Gustaf Sobin
Juliana Spahr
John Taggart
Sam Truitt
Jean Valentine
Lewis Warsh
Claire Nicolas White
Nathan Whiting
Dara Wier
Charles Wright
John Yau

Works published in other languages

China
 Han Dong:
 Baba zai tianshang kan wo ("Daddy's Watching Me in Heaven"), Hebei: jiaoyu chubanshe,
 ("Running Criss-cross"), Dunhuang: wenyi chubanshe
 He Xiaozhu,  ("6 Verbs, or Apples"), Hebei: jiaoyu chubanshe
 Jimu Langge,  ("The silent revolver"), Hebei: jiaoyu chubanshe

French language

Canada, in French
 Denise Desautels, Pendant la mort, Montréal: Québec Amérique
 Madeleine Gagnon, Le chant de la terre : Poèmes choisis 1978–2002, anthologie préparée par Paul Chanel Malenfant, Montréal, Typo
 Pierre Nepveu, Lignes aériennes, Montréal: Éditions du Noroît
 Madeleine Ouellette-Michalska, Le cycle des migrations, Montréal: Le Noroît
 Jean Royer, Poèmes de veille, Montréal: Le Noroît

France
 Chris Wallace-Crabbe, La Poésie Australienne, Valenciennes: Presses Universitaires, (with Simone Kadi), French translation of the work of this Australian poet

India
In each section, listed in alphabetical order by first name:

Hindi
 Gulzar, Raat Pashmine Ki, New Delhi: Rupa& Co.; in both Urdu and Hindi
 Kunwar Narain, In Dino, New Delhi: Rajkamal Prakashan, 
 Rituraj, Leela Mukharvinda, New Delhi: Medha Books
 Vinod Kumar Shukla, Atrikt Nahin, New Delhi: Vani Prakashan

Other in India
 Bharat Majhi, Saralarekha, Bhubaneswar: Paschima; Oriya-language
 Chandrakanta Murasingh, Ruphaini Buduk Ani Nogo, Agartala: Tripura Publisher: Agartala; Kokborok-language
 Gulzar, Raat Pashmine Ki, New Delhi: Rupa& Co.; in both Urdu and Hindi
 Joy Goswami, Horiner Jonyo Ekok, Kolkata: Ananda Publishers, ; Bengali-language
 K. Satchidanandan, Malayalam-language:
 Bharateeya Kavitayile Pratirodha Paramparyam, ("The Tradition of Dissent of Indian Poetry"); scholarship
 Vikku, ("Stammer")
 K. Siva Reddy; Telugu-language:
 Antarjanam, Hyderabad: Jhari Poetry Circle
 Vrittalekhini, Hyderabad: Jhari Poetry Circle
 Kutti Revathi, Mulaigal ("Breasts"). Chennai: Thamizhini; Tamil-language
 Kynpham Sing Nongkynrih; Kahsi-language:
 Ka Samoi jong ka Lyer ("The Season of the Wind"), Shillong: Author
 Ki Mawsiang ka Sohra ("The Ancient Rocks of Cherra"), Shillong: Author
 Ki Jingkynmaw (Remembrances), Shillong: S. R. Lanong
 Nirendranath Chakravarti, Dekha Hobey, Kolkata: Ananda Publishers; Bengali-language
 Yash Sharma, Bedi Pattan Sanjh Mallah, publisher: Vaasu Prakashan, Jammu; Dogri-language

Poland
 Ewa Lipska, Uwaga: stopień, Krakow: Wydawnictwo literackie
 Czesław Miłosz, Druga przestrzen ("The Second Space"); Cracow: Znak
 Tadeusz Różewicz, Szara strefa ("Gray Zone"), Wrocław: Wydawnictwo Dolnośląskie
 Jarosław Marek Rymkiewicz, Zachód słońca w Milanówku ("Sunset in Milanówek"), Warsaw: Sic!

Other languages
 Christoph Buchwald, general editor, and Lutz Seiler, guest editor, Jahrbuch der Lyrik 2003 ("Poetry Yearbook 2003"), publisher: Beck; anthology
 Klaus Høeck, Projekt Perseus, publisher: Arena; Denmark
 Rami Saari,  ("So Much, So Much War"), Israel
 Maria Luisa Spaziani, Poesie dalla mano sinistra, Italy
 Wisława Szymborska: Chwila ("Moment"), Poland
 Søren Ulrik Thomsen, Det værste og det bedste, illustrated by Ib Spang Olsen; Denmark

Awards and honors

Australia
 C. J. Dennis Prize for Poetry: Robert Gray, Afterimages
 Dinny O'Hearn Poetry Prize: After Images by Robert Gray
 Kenneth Slessor Prize for Poetry: Alan Wearne, The Lovemakers
 Mary Gilmore Prize: Geraldine McKenzie, Duty

Canada
 Gerald Lampert Award: Aislinn Hunter, Into the Early Hours
 Archibald Lampman Award: Armand Garnet Ruffo, At Geronimo's Grave
 Atlantic Poetry Prize: M. Travis Lane, Keeping Afloat
 The office of Canadian Parliamentary Poet Laureate is instituted, George Bowering is the first appointee and will serve until 2004
 2002 Governor General's Awards: Roy Miki, Surrender (English); Robert Dickson, Humains paysages en temps de paix relative (French)
 Griffin Poetry Prize: Canada: Christian Bök, Eunoia; International, in the English Language:  Alice Notley, Disobedience
 Pat Lowther Award: Heather Spears, Required Reading: A Witness in Words and Drawings to the Reena Virk Trials 1998-2000
 Prix Alain-Grandbois: Michel Beaulieu, Trivialités
 Dorothy Livesay Poetry Prize: Karen Solie, Short Haul Engine
 Prix Émile-Nelligan: Benoît Jutras, Nous serons sans voix

New Zealand
 Prime Minister's Awards for Literary Achievement:
 Montana New Zealand Book Awards (no poetry category winner this year) First-book award for poetry: Chris Price, Husk, Auckland University Press

United Kingdom
 Cholmondeley Award: Moniza Alvi, David Constantine, Liz Lochhead, Brian Patten
 Eric Gregory Award: Caroline Bird, Christopher James, Jacob Polley, Luke Heeley, Judith Lal, David Leonard Briggs, Eleanor Rees, Kathryn Simmonds
 Forward Poetry Prize Best Collection): Peter Porter, Max is Missing (Picador); Best First Collection: Tom French, Touching the Bones (The Gallery Press)
 Queen's Gold Medal for Poetry: Peter Porter
 T. S. Eliot Prize (United Kingdom and Ireland): Alice Oswald, Dart
 Whitbread Award for poetry (United Kingdom):

United States
 Agnes Lynch Starrett Poetry Prize awarded to Shao Wei for Pulling a Dragon's Teeth
 Aiken Taylor Award for Modern American Poetry, Grace Schulman
 AML Awards for poetry to Kimberly Johnson for Leviathan with a Hook
 Arthur Rense Prize for poetry awarded to B.H. Fairchild by the American Academy of Arts and Letters
 Bernard F. Connors Prize for Poetry, Timothy Donnelly, "His Long Imprison'd Thought"
 Bobbitt National Prize for Poetry, Alice Fulton for Felt
 Brittingham Prize in Poetry, Anna George Meek, Acts of Contortion
 Frost Medal: Galway Kinnell
 National Book Award for poetry (United States): Ruth Stone, In the Next Galaxy
 Poet Laureate of Virginia: George Garrett, two year appointment 2002 to 2004
 Pulitzer Prize for Poetry: Carl Dennis, Practical Gods
 Robert Fitzgerald Prosody Award: Paul Fussell
 Ruth Lilly Poetry Prize: Lisel Mueller
 Wallace Stevens Award: Ruth Stone
 Whiting Awards: Elizabeth Arnold, David Gewanter, Joshua Weiner
 William Carlos Williams Award: Li-Young Lee, Book of My Nights (American Poets Continuum), Judge: Carolyn Kizer
 Fellowship of the Academy of American Poets: Sharon Olds

Other
 Grand Austrian State Prize for Literature (2001 prize given this year): Gert Jonke

Deaths
Birth years link to the corresponding "[year] in poetry" article:
 February 9 – Ale Ahmad Suroor, 90 (born 1911), Indian Urdu-language poet
 March 9 – Hamish Henderson, 81 (born 1919), Scottish poet, folk song collector and soldier
 May 1 – Ebrahim Al-Arrayedh (إبراهيم العريّض) (born 1908), Bahraini poet
 June 14 – June Jordan, 65 (born 1936), Jamaican American poet, of breast cancer
 June 27 – Alan Brunton, 55 (born 1946), New Zealand poet and scriptwriter, died on visit to Amsterdam
 July 6 – Kenneth Koch, 77 (born 1925), American poet, of leukemia
 July 14 – Nabakanta Barua, also known as Ekhud Kokaideu, 75 (born 1926), Indian Assamese-language novelist and poet
 August 25 – Dorothy Hewett 79 (born 1923), Australian feminist writer
 September 27 – Charles Henri Ford, 89 (born 1908), American novelist, poet, filmmaker, photographer and collage artist
 October 21 – Harbhajan Singh, 82 (born 1920), Punjabi poet, critic, cultural commentator and translator
 October 28 – Annada Shankar Ray, 98 (born 1905), Bengali poet
 December 9 – Stan Rice, 60 (born 1942), American painter, educator, poet, husband of author Anne Rice, of brain cancer

See also

Poetry
List of years in poetry
List of poetry awards

Notes

 "A Timeline of English Poetry" Web page of the Representative Poetry Online Web site, University of Toronto

2000s in poetry

Poetry